Damnation (from Latin damnatio) is the concept of divine punishment and torment in an afterlife for actions that were committed on Earth.

Damnation may also refer to:

Music
 Damnation (album), a 2003 album by Opeth
 Damnation (Ride the Madness), a 1999 album by Eva O
 Damnation/Salvation, a 2005 album by Eva O

Other media
 Damnation (TV series), an American period drama that premiered in November 2017
 Damnation (documentary), a 2014 American documentary about the changing attitudes in the United States towards the large dams in the country
 Damnation (video game), a 2009 steampunk shooter
 Damnation (film), a 1988 Hungarian film directed by Béla Tarr
 Damnation (comics), a comic book limited series

See also
 
 
 Dam (disambiguation)
 Dammit (disambiguation)
 Damn (disambiguation)
 Damned (disambiguation)